Richard "Skeets" Gallagher (July 28, 1891  – May 22, 1955) was an American actor. He had blue eyes and his naturally blond hair was tinged with grey from the age of sixteen.

Biography
He was born on July 28, 1891 in Terre Haute, Indiana.  As a child he was nicknamed "Skeets" short for mosquito, due to his frequent speedy bursts of running.

Gallagher was educated at Rose Polytechnic Institute and Indiana University. He first studied civil engineering and then law, but ended up on the stage. He began his career by writing a one-act skit that he took to a local theatre group. 

He started acting in vaudeville, and later signed up with Paramount Pictures.

He was often billed as Skeets Gallagher on Broadway and in Hollywood. He appeared in Frank Capra's first feature film For the Love of Mike (1927), a silent film which is now considered a lost film, and several early sound films.

He died on May 22, 1955, in Santa Monica, California, of a heart attack.

Partial filmography

The Daring Years (1923) – College boy
The Potters (1927) – Red Miller
New York (1927) – Buck
For the Love of Mike (1927) – Coxey Pendleton
Finders Keepers (1928) – Soldier who pursues Blondy (uncredited)
Alex the Great (1928) – Alex the Great
Three-Ring Marriage (1928) – Gangster
The Racket (1928) – Miller
Stocks and Blondes (1928) – Tom Greene
Close Harmony (1929) – Johnny Bay
The Dance of Life (1929) – (uncredited)
Fast Company (1929) – Bert Wade
Pointed Heels (1929) – Dash Nixon
Honey (1930) – Charles Dangerfield
Paramount on Parade (1930) – Supporting Role – Episode 'The Gallows Song'
The Social Lion (1930) – Chick Hathaway
Love Among the Millionaires (1930) – Boots McGee
Let's Go Native (1930) – King Jerry
Her Wedding Night (1930) – Bob Talmadge
It Pays to Advertise (1931) – Ambrose Peale
The Stolen Jools (1931, Short) – Reporter
Up Pops the Devil (1931) – Biney Hatfield
The Road to Reno (1931) – Hoppie
Possessed (1931) – Wally Stuart
The Trial of Vivienne Ware (1932) – Graham McNally
Merrily We Go to Hell (1932) – Buck
Bird of Paradise (1932) – Chester
The Night Club Lady (1932) – Tony
The Phantom of Crestwood (1932) – Eddie Mack
The Sport Parade (1932) – Dizzy
The Conquerors (1932) – Benson (uncredited)
The Unwritten Law (1932) – Pete Brown
The Past of Mary Holmes (1933) – Ben Pratt
Reform Girl (1933) – Joe Burke
 Easy Millions (1933)
Too Much Harmony (1933) – Johnny Dixon
In the Money (1933) – Spunk Hobbs
Alice in Wonderland (1933) – Rabbit
The Meanest Gal in Town (1934) – Jack Hayden
The Crosby Case (1934) – The Reporter – Miller
Woman Unafraid (1934) – Anthony Desmond
Riptide (1934) – Erskine
Bachelor Bait (1934) – Bramwell Van Dusen
Lightning Strikes Twice (1934) – Wally Richards
The Perfect Clue (1935) – Ronnie Van Zandt
Yours for the Asking (1936) – Perry Barnes
The Man I Marry (1936) – Jack Gordon
Polo Joe (1936) – Haywood
Hats Off (1936) – Buzz Morton
Espionage (1937) – Jimmy Brown
Mr. Satan (1938) – Connelly
Danger on the Air (1938) – Finney Fish
Idiot's Delight (1939) – Donald Navadel
Citadel of Crime (1941) – Chet
Zis Boom Bah (1941) – Professor Warren
Brooklyn Orchid (1942) – Tommy Lyman Goodweek
Duke of Chicago (1949) – Gus Weller
Three for Bedroom "C" (1952) – Dining Car Steward (uncredited)

References

Further reading
 Film Star: Who's Who on the Screen (1938), British Film Magazine

External links

 
 
 
 

1891 births
1955 deaths
American male film actors
American male silent film actors
Male actors from Indiana
Actors from Terre Haute, Indiana
Vaudeville performers
20th-century American male actors
Rose–Hulman Institute of Technology alumni
Indiana University alumni